Thriller is the sixth studio album by the American singer and songwriter Michael Jackson, released on November 29, 1982, by Epic Records. It was produced by Quincy Jones, who had previously worked with Jackson on his 1979 album Off the Wall. Jackson wanted to create an album where "every song was a killer". With the ongoing backlash against disco music at the time, he moved in a new musical direction, resulting in a mix of pop, post-disco, rock, funk, and R&B sounds. Thriller foreshadows the contradictory themes of Jackson's personal life, as he began using a motif of paranoia and darker themes. Paul McCartney appears on "The Girl Is Mine", the first credited appearance of a featured artist on a Michael Jackson album. Recording took place from April to November 1982 at Westlake Recording Studios in Los Angeles, California, with a budget of $750,000.

Thriller became Jackson's first number-one album on the US Billboard Top LPs & Tapes chart, where it spent a record 37 non-consecutive weeks at number one, from February 26, 1983, to April 14, 1984. Seven singles were released: "The Girl Is Mine", "Billie Jean", "Beat It", "Wanna Be Startin' Somethin'", "Human Nature", "P.Y.T. (Pretty Young Thing)", and "Thriller". They all reached the top 10 on the US Billboard Hot 100 chart, setting a record for the most top 10 singles from an album, with "Beat It" and "Billie Jean" reaching number one. Following Jackson's performance of "Billie Jean" in the Motown 25 television special, where he debuted his signature moonwalk dance, the sales of the album significantly increased, selling one million copies worldwide per week. The "Thriller" music video was premiered to great anticipation in December 1983 and played regularly on MTV, which also increased the sales.

With 32 million copies sold worldwide by the end of 1983, Thriller became the best-selling album of all time. It was the best-selling album of 1983 worldwide, and in 1984 it became the first album to become the best-selling in the United States for two years. It set industry standards with its songs, music videos, and promotional strategies influencing artists, record labels, producers, marketers, and choreographers. The success gave Jackson an unprecedented level of cultural significance for a black American, breaking racial barriers in popular music, earning him regular airplay on MTV and leading to a meeting with US President Ronald Reagan at the White House. Thriller was among the first albums to use music videos as promotional tools; the videos for "Billie Jean", "Beat It" and "Thriller" are credited for transforming music videos into a serious art form.

Thriller is the best-selling album of all time, with sales of 70 million copies worldwide. It is the best selling non-compilation album and second-best-selling album overall in the United States and was certified 34× platinum by the Recording Industry Association of America (RIAA) in 2021. It won a record-breaking eight Grammy Awards at the 1984 Grammy Awards, including Album of the Year, while "Beat It" won Record of the Year. Jackson also won a record-breaking eight American Music Awards at the 1984 American Music Awards. The album has been a frequent inclusion in lists of the greatest albums of all time. In 2008, it was inducted into the Grammy Hall of Fame. In the same year, the Library of Congress added it to the National Recording Registry of "culturally, historically, or aesthetically significant recordings".

Background 
Jackson's previous album Off the Wall (1979) received critical acclaim and was a commercial success, having sold 10 million copies at the time. The years between Off the Wall and Thriller were a transitional period for Jackson, a time of increased independence. The period saw him become deeply unhappy; Jackson said, "Even at home, I'm lonely. I sit in my room sometimes and cry. It's so hard to make friends ... I sometimes walk around the neighborhood at night, just hoping to find someone to talk to. But I just end up coming home."

When Jackson turned 21 in August 1979, he hired John Branca as his manager. Jackson told Branca that he wanted to be the biggest and wealthiest star in showbusiness. He was upset about what he perceived as the underperformance of Off the Wall, feeling it had deserved the Grammy Award for Record of the Year. He also felt undervalued by the music industry; in 1980, when Rolling Stone declined to run a cover story on him, Jackson responded: "I've been told over and over that black people on the cover of magazines doesn't sell copies ... Just wait. Some day those magazines are going to be begging me for an interview. Maybe I'll give them one, and maybe I won't."

For his next album, Jackson wanted to create an album where "every song was a killer". He was frustrated by albums that would have "one good song, and the rest were like B-sides ... Why can't every one be like a hit song? Why can't every song be so great that people would want to buy it if you could release it as a single? ... That was my purpose for the next album."

Production and composition

Recording 

Jackson reunited with Off the Wall producer Quincy Jones to record his sixth studio album, his second under the Epic label. They worked together on 30 songs, nine of which were included on the album. Thriller was recorded at Westlake Recording Studios in Los Angeles, California, with a production budget of $750,000 (US$1,926,319.15 in 2017 dollars). The recording commenced on April 14, 1982, at noon with Jackson and Paul McCartney recording "The Girl Is Mine"; it was completed on the final day of mixing, November 8, 1982. Several members of the band Toto were involved in the album's recording and production. Jackson wrote four songs for the record: "Wanna Be Startin' Somethin'", "The Girl Is Mine", "Beat It" and "Billie Jean". Unlike many artists, Jackson did not write these songs on paper. Instead, he dictated into a sound recorder; when recording he would sing from memory.

The relationship between Jackson and Jones became strained during the recording. Jackson spent much of his time rehearsing dance steps alone. When the album was completed, both Jones and Jackson were unhappy with the result and remixed every song, spending a week on each.

"Billie Jean" was so personal to Jackson, who struggled with obsessed fans. Jones wanted to shorten the long introduction, but Jackson insisted that it remain because it made him want to dance. The ongoing backlash against disco made it necessary to move in a different musical direction from the disco-heavy Off the Wall. Jones and Jackson were determined to make a rock song that would appeal to all tastes and spent weeks looking for a suitable guitarist for the song "Beat It". Eventually, they found Steve Lukather of Toto to play the rhythm guitar parts and Eddie Van Halen of the rock band Van Halen to play the solo.

When Rod Temperton wrote the song "Thriller", he wanted to call it "Starlight" or "Midnight Man", but settled on "Thriller" because he felt the name had merchandising potential. Wanting a notable person to recite the closing lyrics, Jones brought in actor Vincent Price, an acquaintance of Jones' wife; Price completed his part in two takes. Temperton wrote the spoken portion in a taxi on the way to the recording studio. Jones and Temperton said that some recordings were left off the final cut because they did not have the "edginess" of other album tracks.

Music and lyrics 
Thriller explores genres including post-disco, funk, pop, and rock. According to Steve Huey of AllMusic, it refined the strengths of Off the Wall; the dance and rock tracks are more aggressive, while the pop tunes and ballads are softer and more soulful. The album includes the ballads "Human Nature", "The Girl Is Mine" and "The Lady in My Life". The funk tracks "Billie Jean" and "Wanna Be Startin' Something'", and the disco songs "Baby Be Mine" and "P.Y.T. (Pretty Young Thing)".

"Wanna Be Startin' Somethin'" climaxes in an African-inspired chant (often misidentified as Swahili, but actually syllables based on Duala), giving the song an international flavor. "The Girl Is Mine" tells of two friends' fight over a woman, arguing over who loves her more, and concludes with a rap. The album's songs have a tempo ranging from 80 beats per minute on "The Girl is Mine", to 138 on "Beat It".

Thriller foreshadows the contradictory themes of Jackson's later works. With Thriller, Jackson began using a motif of paranoia and darker themes including supernatural imagery in the title track. This is evident on the songs "Billie Jean", "Wanna Be Startin' Somethin'" and "Thriller". In "Billie Jean", Jackson sings about an obsessive fan who alleges he fathered her child; in "Wanna Be Startin' Somethin'" he argues against media gossip. For "Billie Jean", Jones had Jackson sing overdubs through a six-foot (180 cm) cardboard tube and brought in jazz saxophonist Tom Scott to play the lyricon, a wind-controlled synthesizer. Bassist Louis Johnson ran through his part on a Yamaha bass guitar. The song opens with a long bass-and-drums introduction. "Thriller" includes sound effects such as creaking doors, thunder, footsteps, wind, and howling dogs.

The anti-gang-violence "Beat It" became an homage to West Side Story and was Jackson's first successful rock cross-over piece. Jackson later said of "Beat It", "the point is no one has to be the tough guy, you can walk away from a fight and still be a man. You don't have to die to prove you're a man". "Human Nature", co-written by Steve Porcaro of the band Toto, is moody and introspective, as conveyed in lyrics such as, "Looking out, across the morning, the City's heart begins to beat, reaching out, I touch her shoulder, I'm dreaming of the street".

By the late 1970s, Jackson's abilities as a vocalist were well regarded; AllMusic described him as a "blindingly gifted vocalist". Rolling Stone critic Stephen Holden likened his vocals to the "breathless, dreamy stutter" of Stevie Wonder, and wrote that "Jackson's feathery-timbred tenor is extraordinarily beautiful. It slides smoothly into a startling falsetto that's used very daringly." With the release of Thriller, Jackson could sing low—down to a basso low C—but he preferred to sing higher because pop tenors have more range to create style. Rolling Stone critic Christopher Connelly wrote that Jackson was now singing in a "fully adult voice" that was "tinged by sadness".

"P.Y.T. (Pretty Young Thing)", credited to James Ingram and Quincy Jones, and "The Lady in My Life" by Rod Temperton, gave the album a stronger R&B direction; the latter song was described as "the closest Jackson has come to crooning a sexy, soulful ballad after his Motown years" by J. Randy Taraborrelli. Jackson had already adopted a "vocal hiccup" (first used in 1973 on "It's Too Late to Change the Time"), which he continued to implement in Thriller. The purpose of the hiccup—somewhat like a gulping for air or gasping—is to evoke emotion, be it excitement, sadness, or fear.

Cover 
The cover for Thriller features Jackson in a white suit that belonged to photographer Dick Zimmerman. The gatefold sleeve reveals a tiger cub at Jackson's leg, which, according to Zimmerman, Jackson kept away from his face, fearing he would be scratched. Another picture from the shoot, with Jackson embracing the cub, was used for the 2001 special edition of Thriller.

Release and commercial reception 
Thriller was released on November 30, 1982, by Epic Records and internationally by CBS Records. It reached number one on the Billboard Top LPs & Tapes chart on February 26, 1983. Thriller sold one million copies worldwide per week at its peak. Thriller was the best-selling album in the United States in 1983 and 1984, making it the first album to be the best-selling for two years. It also spent a record 37 weeks at number one on the Billboard 200, from February 26, 1983, to April 14, 1984, and has remained on the chart for 500 nonconsecutive weeks (and counting).

Thriller was Jackson's global breakthrough, topping the charts in Australia, Austria, Canada, France, Italy, Japan, the Netherlands, Switzerland and the United Kingdom. It has gained Diamond certifications in Argentina, Canada, Denmark, France, Mexico and the UK. Thriller sells an estimated 130,000 copies in the US per year; it reached number two in the US Catalog charts in February 2003 and number 39 in the UK in March 2007. It is the sixth-best-selling album in the UK.

On December 16, 2015, Thriller was certified 30× platinum by the Recording Industry Association of America (RIAA), for shipments of at least 30 million units in the US. After the inclusion of streaming and tracks sales into the RIAA album awards in 2017, Thriller was certified 33× platinum for a total of 33 million album-equivalent units. By the end of 1983, Thriller became the world's best-selling album, having sold 32 million copies. It remains the best-selling album of all time, having sold over 70 million copies worldwide.

Singles 
Seven singles were released from Thriller. The first, "The Girl Is Mine", was criticized as a poor choice; critics predicted that the album would disappoint and suggested that Jackson was bowing to a white audience. "The Girl Is Mine" topped the Billboard Hot Black Singles chart, reached number 2 on the Billboard Hot 100 and reached number 1 on the Hot Adult Contemporary Tracks chart.

"Billie Jean" was released on January 2, 1983. It reached number one on the Billboard Hot 100 chart, where it remained for seven weeks. It also topped the Billboard Hot Black Singles chart within three weeks, and it remained at number 1 for nine weeks. Billboard ranked it as the No. 2 song for 1983. It topped the charts in 9 countries and reached the top 10 in many others. "Billie Jean" was one of the best-selling singles of 1983, helping Thriller become the best-selling album of all time. It also became Jackson's best-selling solo single. "Billie Jean" was described as a pioneer of "sleek, post-soul pop music" and also the beginning of a more paranoid lyrical style for Jackson, a trademark of his later music.

The third single, "Beat It", also reached number one on the Black Singles chart. Billboard ranked it number five for 1983. "Beat It" reached number one in Spain and the Netherlands. "Wanna Be Startin' Somethin" was Jackson's fourth consecutive top-ten single from Thriller on the Billboard Hot 100, peaking at number 5. "Human Nature" reached number 7 on the Billboard Hot 100 and number 2 on the Billboard Adult Contemporary chart. "P.Y.T. (Pretty Young Thing)" charted at number 10 on the Billboard Hot 100.

"Thriller", the final single, was released on November 2, 1983. It was not initially planned for release, as Epic saw it as a novelty song; according to executive Walter Yetnikoff, "Who wants a single about monsters?" By mid-1983, when sales of Thriller began to decline, Jackson convinced Epic to release "Thriller", backed by a new music video. It reached number four on the Billboard Hot 100 and number three on the Billboard Hot Black Singles chart.

Music videos 
The "Billie Jean" music video debuted on March 10, 1983, on MTV. It brought MTV—until then a fairly new and unknown music channel—to mainstream attention. It was one of the first videos by a black artist to be aired regularly by the channel, as the network's executives felt black music was not "rock" enough. Directed by Steve Barron, the video shows a photographer who follows Jackson. The paparazzo never catches him, and when photographed Jackson fails to materialize on the developed picture. He dances to Billie Jean's hotel room and as he walks along a sidewalk, each tile lights up at his touch.

The "Beat It" music video had its premiere on MTV during primetime on March 31, 1983. To add authenticity to the production but also to foster peace between them, Jackson had the idea to cast members of rival Los Angeles street gangs the Crips and the Bloods, and included around 80 genuine gang members. Its plot is Jackson bringing two gangsters together through the power of music and dance. It is also notable for its "mass choreography" of synchronized dancers, which was the start of Jackson's trademark music videos.

The "Thriller" music video premiered on MTV on December 2, 1983. In the video, Jackson and his girlfriend (played by Ola Ray) are confronted by  zombies while walking home from a movie theater; Jackson becomes a zombie and performs a dance routine with a horde of the undead. It was named the greatest video of all time by MTV in 1999 and by VH1 and Time in 2001. In 2009, it became the first music video to be selected for the National Film Registry by the Library of Congress. The Library described it as "the most famous music video of all time".

Critical reception 

In a contemporaneous review for Rolling Stone, Christopher Connelly called Thriller "a zesty LP" with a "harrowing, dark message". He compared the songs on the album with the life challenges that the 24-year-old Jackson had faced since Off the Wall, while observing that he "dropped the boyish falsetto" and was facing his "challenges head-on" with "a feisty determination" and "a full, adult voice". Connelly emphasized Jackson's musical progression from Off the Wall, writing, "Jackson's new attitude gives Thriller a deeper, if less visceral, emotional urgency than any of his previous work, and marks another watershed in the creative development of this prodigiously talented performer."

John Rockwell wrote in The New York Times that perhaps Jackson was a "sometimes too practiced ... performer", that at times Quincy Jones may "depersonalize his individuality" with his "slightly anonymous production", and that Jackson may be hiding his true emotions behind "layers of impenetrable, gauzy veils". Rockwell nonetheless deemed Thriller "a wonderful pop record, the latest statement by one of the great singers in popular music today" and that there are "hits here, too, lots of them". Rockwell believed it helped breach "the destructive barriers that spring up regularly between white and black music", especially as "white publications and radio stations that normally avoid black music seem willing to pretend he isn't black after all". In The Village Voice, Robert Christgau said "this is virtually a hits-plus-filler job, but at such a high level it's almost classic anyway". He later wrote in Christgau's Record Guide: The '80s (1990), "what we couldn't know is how brilliantly every hit but 'P.Y.T.' would thrive on mass exposure and public pleasure."

A year after the album's release, Time summed up the three main singles from the album, saying, "The pulse of America and much of the rest of the world moves irregularly, beating in time to the tough strut of 'Billie Jean', the asphalt aria of 'Beat It', the supremely cool chills of 'Thriller'." In 1989, Toronto Star music critics reflected on the albums they had reviewed in the past ten years in order to create a list judging them on the basis of "commercial impact to social import, to strictly musical merit." Thriller was placed at number 1 on the list, where it was referred to as his "master work" and that "commercial success has since overshadowed Jackson's artistic accomplishments on Thriller, and that's a pity. It was a record for the times, brimming with breathless anticipation and a dread fear of the adult world, a brilliant fantasy that pumped with sexual heat, yet made room for serious reflection".

Thriller topped The Village Voices Pazz & Jop poll of 1983. The album won a record-breaking eight Grammy Awards at the 26th Grammy Awards, including Album of the Year. Jackson won seven of the Grammy Awards for the album, while the eighth Grammy Award went to Bruce Swedien. That same year, Jackson won eight American Music Awards, including the American Music Award of Merit, and three MTV Video Music Awards. Thriller was recognized as the best-selling album of all time on February 7, 1984, when it was inducted into the Guinness Book of World Records.

Legacy and influence

Music industry 

Following the release of Thriller, Jackson's immediate success led to him having a standing of cultural significance that was not attained by a Black-American before him in the history of the entertainment industry. Blender described Jackson as the "late 20th century's preeminent pop icon", while The New York Times gave the opinion that he was a "musical phenomenon" and that "in the world of pop music, there is Michael Jackson and there is everybody else". Richard Corliss of Time hailed Thriller as "the greatest pop album of all time". Jackson changed the way the industry functioned: both as an artistic persona and as a financial, profitable entity. His attorney John Branca observed that Jackson achieved the highest royalty rate in the music industry to that point: approximately $2 (US$ in  dollars) for each album sold.

As a result, Jackson earned record-breaking profits from compact disc sales and from the sale of copies of the documentary, The Making of Michael Jackson's Thriller, produced by Jackson and John Landis. Funded by MTV, the film sold over 350,000 copies in its first few months. In a market then driven by singles, Thriller raised the significance of albums, yet its multiple hit singles changed preconceived notions as to the number of successful singles that could be taken from an individual album. The era saw the arrival of novelties like the Michael Jackson doll, that appeared in stores in May 1984 at a price of $12 (US$ in  dollars). Thriller retains a position in American culture; biographer J. Randy Taraborrelli explains, "At some point, Thriller stopped selling like a leisure item—like a magazine, a toy, tickets to a hit movie—and started selling like a household staple".

Thriller was released at around the peak of the album era, which had positioned full-length records ahead of singles as the dominant form of recorded-music consumption and artistic expression in the industry. The success of Thrillers singles, however, marked a brief resurgence in the sales of the format. At the time of the album's release, a press statement from Gil Friesen, the then President of A&M Records, read that, "The whole industry has a stake in this success". Time magazine speculated that "the fallout from Thriller has given the [music] business its best years since the heady days of 1978, when it had an estimated total domestic revenue of $4.1 billion". Time summed up Thrillers impact as a "restoration of confidence" for an industry bordering on "the ruins of punk and the chic regions of synthesizer pop". The publication described Jackson's influence at that point as, "Star of records, radio, rock video. A one-man rescue team for the music business. A songwriter who sets the beat for a decade. A dancer with the fanciest feet on the street. A singer who cuts across all boundaries of taste and style and color too".

When Thriller and "Billie Jean" were searching to reach their market demographic, MTV and cable TV had a smaller market share than the much larger reach of broadcast television stations in the United States. A national broadcast TV audience on ABC, NBC and CBS affiliate stations, as well as major independent TV stations, was desired by CBS/Epic Records to promote Thriller. The national broadcast TV premiere of the Thriller album's first video, "Billie Jean", was during the week of Halloween in October 1984 and was the idea of Video Concert Hall executive producers Charles Henderson and Jerry Crowe. Video Concert Hall, the first nationwide music video TV network, taped the one-hour special in Hollywood and Atlanta, where the TV studios of Video Concert Hall were located. The Thriller TV special was hosted by Thriller video co-star Vincent Price, distributed by Henderson-Crowe Syndications, Inc. and aired in the top 20 TV markets and much of the United States, including TV stations WNEW (New York), WFLD (Chicago), KTTV (Los Angeles), WPLG (Miami), WQTV (Boston) and WXIA (Atlanta), for a total of 150 TV stations.

Thriller had a pioneering impact on black-music genres and crossover. According to ethnomusicologist Miles White, the album completely defined the "sound of post-disco contemporary R&B" and "updated the crossover aesthetic that had been the holy grail of black popular music since Louis Jordan in the 1940s". Noting its unprecedented dominance of mainstream pop music by an African-American artist, White goes on to write that "the record's song selection and sound aesthetics played to soul and pop sensibilities alike, appealing to a broad audience and selling across lines of race, gender, class and generation", while demonstrating Jackson's emergence from Motown as "the king of pop-soul crossover". Entertainment Weekly writer Simon Vozick-Levinson has considered it "the greatest pop-soul album", Included in their list of The 40 Most Groundbreaking Albums of All Time, Rolling Stone wrote, "It's hard to imagine the present-day musical landscape without Thriller, which changed the game both sonically and marketwise. The album's nervy, outsized blend of pop, rock and soul would send seismic waves throughout radio, inviting both marquee crossovers (like Eddie Van Halen's guitar solo on "Beat It") and sneakier attempts at genre-meshing. The album's splashy, cinematic videos — from the John Landis-directed short film that promoted "Thriller" to the West Side Story homage accompanying "Beat It" — legitimized the still-nascent form and forced MTV to incorporate black artists into its playlists. Its promotional strategy, which led to seven of its nine tracks being released as singles, raised the bar for what, exactly, constituted a "hit-laden" LP. Beyond breaking ground, it broke records, showing just how far pop could reach: the biggest selling album of all time, the first album to win eight Grammys in a single night and the first album to stay in the Top 10 charts for a year."

Epic Records also reflected on the importance of the album: "More than just an album, Thriller has remained a global cultural multi-media phenomenon for both the 20th and the 21st centuries, smashing musical barriers and changing the frontiers of pop forever. The music on Thriller is so dynamic and singular that it defied any definition of rock, pop or soul that had gone before."

From the moment Thriller was released, it set the standard for the music industry: artists, record labels, producers, marketers and even choreographers. The music video was ahead of its time and it is considered a monumental one—not only in Jackson's career, but also in the history of pop music. Epic Records' approach to creating a song and video that would appeal to the mass market ended up influencing the way that professionals now market and release their songs. John Landis' production of a mini-movie, rather than the usual short music video, would raise the bar for other directors and producers.

Music videos and racial equality 

Before the success of Thriller, many felt Jackson had struggled to get MTV airtime due to being black. CBS Records president Walter Yetnikoff told MTV: "I'm not going to give you any more videos and I'm going to go public and fucking tell them about the fact you don't want to play music by a black guy." Yetnikoff persuaded MTV to begin airing "Billie Jean" and "Beat It", which led to a long partnership and helped other black artists to gain mainstream recognition. MTV denies claims of racism in their broadcasting.

The popularity of Jackson's videos, such as "Beat It" and "Billie Jean", helped popularize MTV, and its focus shifted towards pop and R&B. Jackson transformed the medium of music video into an artform and promotional tool through the use of complex storylines, dance routines, special effects, and celebrity cameos.

When the 14-minute-long "Thriller" video aired, MTV ran it twice an hour to meet demand. The video marked an increase in scale for music videos and has been routinely named the best music video ever. The video is credited for transforming music videos into a serious artform, breaking down racial barriers in popular entertainment, and popularizing the making-of documentary format. Many elements have had a lasting impact on popular culture such as the zombie dance and Jackson's red jacket designed by Landis's wife Deborah Nadoolman.

Author, music critic and journalist Nelson George wrote in 2004, "It's difficult to hear the songs from Thriller and disengage them from the videos. For most of us the images define the songs. In fact it could be argued that Michael is the first artist of the MTV age to have an entire album so intimately connected in the public imagination with its imagery". Short films like Thriller largely remained unique to Jackson, while the group dance sequence in "Beat It" has been frequently imitated. The choreography in Thriller has become a part of global pop culture, replicated everywhere from Bollywood to prisons in the Philippines.

Jackson's success as a black artist was unprecedented. Time wrote in 1984: "Jackson is the biggest thing since the Beatles. He is the hottest single phenomenon since Elvis Presley. He just may be the most popular black singer ever." According to The Washington Post, Thriller paved the way for other African-American artists to achieve mainstream recognition, such as Prince. Christgau credited "The Girl Is Mine" for giving radio exposure to the idea of interracial love.

Reappraisal 
Thriller has continued to receive critical acclaim. Stephen Thomas Erlewine of AllMusic wrote that it had something to interest everyone. He believed it showcased harder funk and hard rock while remaining "undeniably fun", and wrote that "Wanna Be Startin' Somethin'", was "the freshest funk on the album [but] the most claustrophobic, scariest track Jackson ever recorded." Erlewine felt it was an improvement on Jackson's previous album, although he was critical of the title track, describing it as "ridiculous" and "sucked out the momentum" of the record. In The New Rolling Stone Album Guide (2004), Jon Pareles wrote that Jackson had "doubled his ambitions and multiplied his audience ... Thriller had extra musical help in becoming the best-selling non compilation album of all time: Jackson's dancing feet and dazzling stage presence, amplified by the newfound promotional reach of music video and the Reagan era's embrace of glossy celebrity. But especially in the album's seven hit singles (out of nine songs), the music stands on its own." Culture critic Nelson George wrote that Jackson "has educated R. Kelly, Usher, Justin Timberlake and countless others with Thriller as a textbook".

Rankings 
In 1992, Thriller was awarded the Special Billboard Award to commemorate its 10th anniversary. In 2000, it was voted number 64 in Colin Larkin's All Time Top 1000 Albums. It was also ranked number 2 in the Soul/R&B – All Time Top 50 albums. The book states; it is the finest example of perfect disco pop, and a record that should be prescribed to musical snobs and manic depressives. At the 2002 Billboard Music Awards, as a sign of the album's longevity, Thriller was awarded a second Special Billboard Award as a recognition for spending more weeks at number one on the Billboard 200 than any other album in history. In 2003, it was ranked at number 20 on the Rolling Stone 500 Greatest Albums of All Time list, maintaining the ranking in a 2012 revised list — it's the highest ranked pop album on both lists. In a 2020 updated list by Rolling Stone, Thriller was ranked number 12. It was ranked by the National Association of Recording Merchandisers (NARM), in conjunction with the Rock and Roll Hall of Fame, at number three on its list of the Definitive 200 Albums of All Time. "Beat It" and "Billie Jean" were both included in the Rock and Roll Hall of Fame's 500 Songs That Shaped Rock and Roll. In 2006, Time included Thriller in its list of the All-TIME 100 Albums. In 2008, 25 years after its release, the record was inducted into the Grammy Hall of Fame and, a few weeks later, was among 25 recordings preserved by the Library of Congress to the National Recording Registry as "culturally significant". In 2009, music critics for MTV Base and VH1 both listed Thriller as the best album released since 1981. Thriller, along with other critic favorites, were then polled by the public. 40,000 people found Thriller to be the Best Album of all time by MTV Generation, gaining a third of all votes. Thriller was ranked third on the Greatest of All Time Billboard 200 Albums. Billboard also ranked the album fourth on its list of All 92 Diamond-Certified Albums Ranked from Worst to Best: Critic's Take. In 2018, The Independent named Thriller the "most inspiring album of all time".

Reissues and catalog sales 

Thriller was reissued on October 16, 2001, in an expanded set, Thriller: Special Edition. The album is remastered and includes a new booklet and bonus material, including the songs "Someone in the Dark", "Carousel" and Jackson's original "Billie Jean" demo, as well as audio interviews with Jones and Temperton. Sony also hired sound engineer and mixer Mick Guzauski to create 5.1-channel surround sound mixes of Thriller and Jackson's other albums for the Super Audio CD format, but Jackson did not approve the mixes. Consequently, Thriller was issued on SACD only in a stereo version. A surround sound version of Thriller would not be realized until November 2022, when Sony created and released 360 Reality Audio and Dolby Atmos mixes of Thriller for Amazon Music and Apple Music respectively in honor of the album's 40th anniversary.

In February 2008, Epic Records released Thriller 25; Jackson served as executive producer. Thriller 25 appeared on CD, USB and vinyl with seven bonus tracks, the new song "For All Time", a snippet of Price's voiceover and five remixes featuring American artists Fergie, will.i.am, Kanye West and Akon. It also included a DVD featuring three music videos, the Motown 25 "Billie Jean" performance and a booklet with a message from Jackson. The ballad "For All Time" supposedly dates from 1982, but is often credited as being from the Dangerous sessions.

Thriller 25 was a commercial success and did particularly well as a reissue. It peaked at number one in eight countries and Europe. It peaked at number two in the US, number three in the UK and reached the top 10 in over 30 national charts. It was certified Gold in 11 countries including the UK, received a 2× Gold certification in France and received platinum certification in Poland. In the United States, Thriller 25 was the second-best-selling album of its release week, selling one hundred and sixty six thousand copies, just fourteen thousand short of reaching the number one position. It was ineligible for the Billboard 200 chart as a re-release but entered the Pop Catalog Charts at number one (where it stayed for ten non-consecutive weeks), with the best sales on that chart since December 1996. With the arrival of Halloween that November, Thriller 25 spent an eleventh non-consecutive week atop the US catalog chart. This brought US sales of the album to 688,000 copies, making it the best-selling catalog album of 2008. This was Jackson's best launch since Invincible in 2001, selling three million copies worldwide in 12 weeks.

After Jackson's death in June 2009, Thriller set additional records. the album sold 101,000 units in the US on the chart week ending July 1, 2009 and was the third biggest-selling album of the week. The album placed at number three on the Top Pop Catalog Albums chart. The following week the album sold 187,000 units in the US on the chart week ending July 8, 2009 and was the second biggest-selling album of the week  Songs from Thriller also helped Jackson become the first artist to sell more than one million song downloads in a week. According to Nielsen SoundScan, Thriller was the 14th best-selling album of 2009 in the United States, with 1.27 million copies sold.

For one week beginning November 20, 2015, Google Play Music offered an exclusive free copy of the album to its users in the U.S. which included the 1981 demo of "Billie Jean" as an additional track. On November 18, 2022, Sony Music released Thriller 40, a 40th-anniversary reissue of Thriller including a bonus disc containing outtakes from the original recording sessions.

Track listing 

Notes
  signifies a co-producer
 Sides one and two were combined as tracks 1–9 on CD reissues.
 The first pressings contain the original album mix of "Billie Jean". The main difference is the low volume "oh no" ad-lib in the second verse.

Personnel 
Personnel as listed in the album's liner notes are:

 Tom Bahler – Synclavier 
 Brian Banks – synthesizer , synthesizer programming 
 Steve Bates – assistant engineer 
 Michael Boddicker – synthesizers , Emulator , Vocoder , background vocals 
 Bruce Cannon – effects 
 Leon "Ndugu" Chancler – drums 
 Paulinho da Costa – percussion 
 Mark Ettel – assistant engineer 
 Matt Forger – engineer 
 David Foster – synthesizer , synthesizer arrangement 
 Humberto Gatica – engineer 
 Gary Grant – trumpet and flugelhorn 
 Bernie Grundman – mastering engineer 
 Nelson Hayes – bathroom stomp board 
 Howard Hewett – background vocals 
 Jerry Hey – horn arrangements, trumpet, and flugelhorn , string arrangements , strings conductor 
 Bunny Hull – background vocals 
 James Ingram – background vocals , keyboards, handclaps, and musical arrangements 
 Janet Jackson – background vocals 
 La Toya Jackson – background vocals 
 Michael Jackson – co-producer , lead vocals , background vocals , drum programming , drum case beater , handclaps , horn arrangements and bathroom stomp board , vocal arrangements , rhythm arrangements , synthesizer arrangements 
 Paul Jackson Jr. – guitar 
 Louis Johnson – bass guitar , handclaps 
 Quincy Jones – producer , rhythm arrangements , vocal arrangements , musical arrangements 
 Becky López – background vocals 
 Jerry Lubbock – strings conductor 
 Steve Lukather – guitars , bass guitar , musical arrangements 
 Anthony Marinelli – synthesizer programming 
 Paul McCartney – lead vocals 
 David Paich – synthesizers , rhythm arrangements and piano , musical arrangements 
 Dean Parks – guitar 
 Greg Phillinganes – keyboards , synthesizers , Fender Rhodes , synthesizer programming and handclaps 
 Jeff Porcaro – drums 
 Steve Porcaro – synthesizers , synthesizer programming , musical arrangements 
 Vincent Price – voice-over 
 Steven Ray – bathroom stomp board , handclaps 
 Bill Reichenbach – trombone 
 Greg Smith – Synergy , synthesizer 
 Bruce Swedien – recording engineer and audio mixer , effects 
 Chris Shepard – vibraslap 
 Rod Temperton – synthesizer , rhythm and vocal arrangements 
 Eddie Van Halen – guitar solo 
 Jerry Vinci – concertmaster 
 Julia Waters – background vocals 
 Maxine Waters – background vocals 
 Oren Waters – background vocals 
 David Williams – guitar 
 Larry Williams – saxophone and flute 
 Bill Wolfer – keyboards , synthesizer , programming

Charts

Weekly charts

Year-end charts

Decade-end charts

All-time charts

Certifications and sales

See also 

 "Behind the Mask" (song)
 List of best-selling albums
 List of best-selling albums by country
 List of best-selling albums in Argentina
 List of best-selling albums in Australia
 List of best-selling albums in Austria
 List of best-selling albums in Belgium
 List of best-selling albums in Brazil
 List of best-selling albums in Canada
 List of best-selling albums in Colombia
 List of best-selling albums in Europe
 List of best-selling albums in Finland
 List of best-selling albums in France
 List of best-selling albums in Germany
 List of best-selling albums in Italy
 List of best-selling albums in Japan
 List of best-selling albums in Mexico
 List of best-selling albums in New Zealand
 List of best-selling albums in the United Kingdom
 List of best-selling albums in the United States
 List of diamond-certified albums in Argentina
 List of diamond-certified albums in Canada
 List of number-one dance singles of 1983 (U.S.)

Notes

References

Bibliography

External links 
 

1982 albums
Michael Jackson albums
Epic Records albums
Albums produced by Michael Jackson
Albums produced by Quincy Jones
Albums recorded at Westlake Recording Studios
Brit Award for British Album of the Year
Grammy Hall of Fame Award recipients
Grammy Award for Album of the Year
Grammy Award for Best Engineered Album, Non-Classical
Grammy Award for Best Male Pop Vocal Performance
United States National Recording Registry albums